The Ledger Awards are prizes awarded to  "acknowledge excellence in Australian comic art and publishing." Named after pioneering Australian cartoonist Peter Ledger (1945–1994), the awards were first held in 2005 to help promote and focus attention on Australian creators and their projects, both in Australia and overseas. Initially, the awards were held annually and announced online on or around Australia Day, 26 January. In recent years, they have been held at the State Library of Victoria on the Friday evening before the Melbourne Supanova convention.

History 
The Ledger Awards began in 2004 as a fully independent, non-profit initiative. They were presented under the auspices of LitterArtsy, a non-profit coalition of creators, publishers and web sites promoting literacy, creativity, craft and excellence through comics and sequential art, and had no affiliations or links with organisations, businesses, or other parties.

The Ledger Awards were presented annually until 2007, when they went on hiatus. In 2010 it was announced that a new Ledger Awards Organising Committee had been formed; the Committee held an inaugural meeting, with a view to the awards being re-established in 2011.

In late 2013, it was announced that the Ledger Awards would return after a five-year hiatus in April 2014, with a new major sponsor, Supanova Pop Culture Expo. The 2014 Ledger Awards ceremony was held 11 April 2014, at the State Library of Victoria.

On 12 April 2014, the Ledger Awards named "gap year" award recipients for the years 2008–2013 when no Ledger Awards were distributed.

Awards

2004
Nominees were suggested through a forum thread, compiled into a poll and winners were decided by popular vote. The winners were announced on Australian Day, 2005.

The nominees and winners in the first year were

PERSON OF THE YEAR
Mark Selan (Winner)
Aaron Burgess
Daniel Zachariou

ACHIEVEMENT OF THE YEAR
Gary Chaloner's John Law in print (Winner)
Dillon Naylor's 2004 (Batrisha wear in Target etc.)
Phase Two Comics

NEW TALENT DESERVING WIDER RECOGNITION
Matt Huynh (Winner)
Jase Harper
Chelsea Fritzlaff

SMALL PRESS TITLE OF THE YEAR
Eat Comics, Tonia Walden, editor (Winner)
Sporadic, Jase Harper & Jules Faber, editors
Dirty Little Creep, Mandy Ord

INDEPENDENT PRESS TITLE OF THE YEAR
The Crumpleton Experiments, Nautilus Illustrations (Winner)
Killeroo, Ozone Studios
Azerath, Creatorline/Phosphorescent Comics

INTERNATIONAL TITLE OF THE YEAR
Will Eisner's John Law: Dead Man Walking, IDW (Winner)
Small Gods, Image Comics
District X, Marvel Comics

ANTHOLOGY OF THE YEAR
Eat Comics, Tonia Walden, editor (Winner)
Sporadic, Jase Harper & Jules Faber, editors
The Ink, Aaron Burgess, editor

WEBCOMIC OF THE YEAR
Platinum Grit (Winner)
Will Eisner's John Law
Raymondo Person

WRITER OF THE YEAR
Trudy Cooper et al. (Winner)
Christian Read
Daniel Reed

ARTIST OF THE YEAR
Trudy Cooper (Winner)
Jason Badower
Jase Harper

INKER OF THE YEAR
Gary Chaloner (Winner)
Doug Holgate
Darren Close
Daniel Reed

COLOURIST OF THE YEAR
Annette Kwok (Winner)
Doug Holgate
Jason Badower

LETTERER OF THE YEAR
Gary Chaloner (Winner)
Jason Paulos
Jason Kovacs

COVER ARTIST OF THE YEAR
Gary Chaloner, Will Eisner's John Law: Dead Man Walking (Winner)
Matt Huynh, Domino Joe, Bloom
Jason Badower, Killeroo Book 2

SINGLE ISSUE OR STORY OF THE YEAR
'Law, Luck and a Dead Eyed Mystic' (Will Eisner's John Law: Dead Man Walking), Gary Chaloner (Winner)
The Eldritch Kid #1, Christian Read & Christopher Burns
'Meat Burger Heaven' (Eat Comics), Dean Rankine
'Good for the Goose' (Killeroo Book 2), Jan Napiorkowski & Jason Badower

COMIC STRIP OF THE YEAR
Batrisha (K-Zone et al.), Dillon Naylor (Winner)
Grossgirl and Boogerboy (Mania), Dean Rankine
Raymondo Person, Patrick Alexander

RETAIL OUTLET OF THE YEAR
Kings Comics, Sydney (Winner)
Phase Two Comics, online
Minotaur Books, Melbourne

DESIGN OR PRESENTATION OF THE YEAR
The Watch: Casus Belli, design by Karen Howard (Winner)
Killeroo Book Two, design by Darren Close
Keychain Comics, design by Aaron Burgess

LEDGER OF HONOUR 
Peter Ledger* (automatically inducted)
Gary Chaloner (Winner)
Trudy Cooper
Tim McEwen
Tonia Walden

2005
Feedback from the first Awards resulted in a reduction in categories and the installation of a Judges Panel. Again, nominations were made by the public through postings on a message board forum. Some categories were decided by public vote, others were judged by the panel.

The first iteration of the Judges Panel was Mark Selan, Denis Kitchen, Roger Langridge, Glen Lumsden and Kevin Patrick. Denis Kitchen pulled out and was replaced with Mark Waid, Waid was then replaced by RC Harvey. Both Langridge and Harvey were replaced by Tad Pietrzykowski and Gary Chaloner.

The popular voted winners were announced on Australia Day 2006.

Publicly voted categories

ACHIEVEMENT OF THE YEAR
(Australian artist, publisher, entrepreneur or event - business or creative)
 GOLD: Operation Funnybone (Glen Shearer, co-ordinator)
 SILVER: OzComics 24 Hour Comics Challenge (Mark Selan, co-ordinator)
 BRONZE: Pulp Faction Forums (Maggie McFee, co-ordinator)

TALENT DESERVING WIDER RECOGNITION
(In recognition of excellence in 2005 - print or web)
 GOLD: Stephen Crowley
 SILVER: Dean Rankine
 BRONZE: Steve Martinez

RETAIL OUTLET OF THE YEAR
(In recognition of Australian retail excellence and support during the year)
 GOLD: Phase Two Comics, online
 SILVER: Kings Comics, Sydney
 BRONZE: Minotaur Books, Melbourne

FAVOURITE FOREIGN COMIC BOOK OR GRAPHIC NOVEL OF THE YEAR
(Favourite comic book or graphic novel (English or foreign language) released by overseas publishers during the year)
 GOLD: Flight 2
 SILVER: Daisy Kutter - The Last Train
 BRONZE: Garfield

FAVOURITE FOREIGN CREATOR OF THE YEAR
(Favourite international creator (artist, writer etc.) with work released during the year)
 GOLD: Mike Mignola
 SILVER: Kazu Kibuishi
 BRONZE: Paul Grist

Peer voted categories

The Judges Awards were announced at Doujicon on 28 July 2006

SMALL PRESS TITLE OF THE YEAR
(Mini comics, zines featuring comic content etc.)
 GOLD: Happy Birthday Anyway - Matt Huynh
 SILVER: Pirates - Tonia Walden
 BRONZE: Dreams of Tomorrow - Liz Argall

INDEPENDENT PRESS TITLE OF THE YEAR
(Local publishers distributing mainly in Australia)
 GOLD: Eldritch Kid by Christian Read (story) & Christopher Burns (Art), Phosphorescent Comics/Creatorline
 SILVER: Platinum Grit by Trudy Cooper, Doug Bayne and Danny Murphy
 BRONZE: The Crumpleton Experiments by Daniel Reed, Nautilus Illustrations

INTERNATIONAL TITLE OF THE YEAR
(Titles distributed overseas and within Australia featuring Australian talent)
 GOLD: Small Gods - Jason Rand (story) Image Comics
 SILVER: Fell - Ben Templesmith (art) Image Comics
 BRONZE: DeeVee - Flange, Eddie Campbell, Daren White & various. DeeVee Press (90)

WEBCOMIC OR COMIC OF THE YEAR
(Webcomics or comic strips produced by Australian creators)
 GOLD: Big Fun Mega Happy Pet Land by Jase Harper (Mania Magazine)
 SILVER: Magellan by Stephen Crowley
 BRONZE: Raymondo Person by Patrick Alexander

WRITER OF THE YEAR
(In recognition of writing excellence in 2005 by an Australian creator - print or web)
 GOLD: Trudy Cooper (Platinum Grit)
 SILVER: Christian Read (Eldritch Kid, various)
 BRONZE: Matt Huynh (Happy Birthday Anyway, various)

ARTIST OF THE YEAR
(Full art, penciller, painter or multimedia. In recognition of excellence in 2005 by an Australian creator - print or web)
 GOLD: Doug Holgate ('Laika', various)
 SILVER: Trudy Cooper (Platinum Grit)
 BRONZE: Matt Huynh (Happy Birthday Anyway, various)

SINGLE ISSUE OR STORY OF THE YEAR
(In recognition of excellence in a particular issue or short story in 2005 by an Australian creator/s - print or web)
 GOLD: "Laika" by Doug Holgate, (Flight Vol.2)
 SILVER: "The Record" by Christian Read (story) & Tonia Walden (art), (Something Wicked)
 BRONZE: Star Wars Tales #27, illustrated by Nicola Scott (Dark Horse Comics)

PRODUCTION DESIGN OF THE YEAR
(Australian artist, publisher, entrepreneur or event - business or creative)
 GOLD: Glen Shearer and Darren Close, Operation Funnybone
 SILVER: Troy Kealley (cover by Simon Sherry), Something Wicked
 BRONZE: Tonia Walden, Pirates, various

LEDGER OF HONOUR
(Nominees chosen from Australian creators, publishers or retailers past or present)
 Peter Ledger (automatically inducted)
 Gary Chaloner (2005)
 Trudy Cooper (2006)

2006
The nominees for work published in the 2006 calendar year, and to be presented in 2007 are as follows:

Publicly voted categories

ACHIEVEMENT OF THE YEAR
 OzComics 24 Hour Comics Challenge 2006
 Surfing the Deathline
 Doujicon
 Heroes and Villains Exhibition - (State Library of Victoria)
 Local Act Comics

RETAIL OUTLET OF THE YEAR
 Kings Comics, Sydney
 Minotaur Books, Melbourne
 Phase Two Comics, online
 Pulp Fiction, Adelaide

FAVOURITE FOREIGN COMIC BOOK OR GRAPHIC NOVEL OF THE YEAR
 Allstar Superman (DC Comics)
 Monster (Viz)
 Fell (Image Comics)
 The Losers (DC/Vertigo)
 The Boys (DC/Vertigo)
 Invincible (Image Comics)
 Hellboy: Strange Places (Dark Horse Comics)
 The Dark Horse Book of Monsters (Dark Horse Comics)

FAVOURITE FOREIGN CREATOR OF THE YEAR
 Jeffrey Brown
 Brian K. Vaughan
 Frank Quitely
 Jock
 Garth Ennis
 Peter David
 Adam Hughes
 Warren Ellis
 Colleen Doran

LEDGER OF HONOUR
 Greg Gates
 Dillon Naylor
 Jason Paulos

Jury selection

The following categories will be decided by the judging panel from the top nominations listed:

AUSTRALIAN TITLE OF THE YEAR
 Surfing the Deathline, Matt Godden (story & art), Golgotha Graphics
 Passionate Nomads, Philip Bentley and various
 Azerath by Daniel Lawson (story) and Ryan Wilton (art), Phosphorescent Comics/Creatorline

INTERNATIONAL TITLE OF THE YEAR
 What If? X-Men: Deadly Genesis, David Yardin (art) Marvel Comics
 Birds of Prey, Nicola Scott (art) DC Comics
 Detective Comics, Shane McCarthy (story) DC Comics

WEBCOMIC OR COMIC STRIP OF THE YEAR
 Platinum Grit by Trudy Cooper and Danny Murphy [webcomic view]
 Maxwell the Demon by Tonia Walden [webcomic view]
 Comicsface by Ive Sorocuk

WRITER OF THE YEAR
 Matt Godden (Surfing the Deathline)
 Philip Bentley (Passionate Nomads, Word Balloons)
 Graeme McDonald (Vigil, After Life)

ARTIST OF THE YEAR
 Trudy Cooper (Platinum Grit)
 Matt Godden (Surfing the Deathline)
 Colin Wells (Vigil)
 David Yardin (What If? X-Men: Deadly Genesis, various )

SINGLE ISSUE OR STORY OF THE YEAR
 "The Amorous Adventures of Jane Digby", Philip Bentley (story) and various (artist), Passionate Nomads
 "Surfing the Deathline, Episode 1" by Matt Godden (story & art), Surfing the Deathline #1
 "Crab Allan: Gothic Boogaloo" by Luke Weber (story & art), Sureshot Presents...

PRODUCTION DESIGN OF THE YEAR
 Darrel Merritt, Passionate Nomads
 Matt Godden, Surfing the Deathline
 David Cunning, Local Act Comics

2007
The nominees and winners for 2007 were:

AUSTRALIAN TITLE OF THE YEAR (local publishers distributing mainly in Australia)
 "Passionate Nomads" - Philip Bentley and various (winner)
 "Surfing the Deathline" - Matt Godden (story & art), Golgotha Graphics
 "Azerath" - Daniel Lawson (story) and Ryan Wilton (art), Phosphorescent Comics/Creatorline

INTERNATIONAL TITLE OF THE YEAR (titles distributed overseas and within Australia featuring Australian talent)
 "What If: X-Men" - David Yardin (pencils), Marvel Comics (winner)
 "Birds of Prey" - Nicola Scott (art). DC Comics
 "Detective Comics" - Shane McCarthy (writer), DC Comics

WEBCOMIC OR COMIC STRIP OF THE YEAR (produced by Australian creators)
 "Platinum Grit" - Trudy Cooper/Danny Murphy (winner/tie)
 "Maxwell - Demon" by Tonia Walden (winner/tie)
 "Comicsface" - Ive Sorocuk

WRITER OF THE YEAR (print or web)
 Philip Bentley ("Passionate Nomads", Word Balloons)
 Matt Godden ("Surfing the Deathline", Golgotha Graphics)
 Graeme McDonald ("Vigil", After Life)

ARTIST OF THE YEAR (full art, penciller, painter or multimedia. Print or web)
 Trudy Cooper ("Platinum Grit")
 David Yardin ("What If? X-Men: Deadly Genesis", various )
 Matt Godden ("Surfing the Deathline")

SINGLE ISSUE OR STORY OF THE YEAR (print or web)
 "The Amorous Adventures of Jane Digby", Philip Bentley (story) and various (artist), Passionate Nomads (winner)
 "Surfing the Deathline, Episode 1" by Matt Godden (story & art), Surfing the Deathline #1
 "Crab Allan: Gothic Boogaloo" by Luke Weber (story & art), Sureshot Presents...

PRODUCTION DESIGN OF THE YEAR (Australian comic, website, publication or event)
 Darrel Merritt ("Passionate Nomads") (winner)
 Matt Godden ("Surfing the Deathline")
 David Cunning (Local Act Comics)

ACHIEVEMENT OF THE YEAR (Australian artist, publisher, entrepreneur or event. Business or creative)
 Doujicon (Avi Bernshaw, co-ordinator) (winner)
 24 Hour Comics Challenge (Mark Selan, co-ordinator)
 Heroes and Villains Exhibition (Kevin Patrick, curator)

RETAIL OUTLET OF THE YEAR (in recognition of Australian retail excellence and support in 2006)
 Kings Comics, Sydney (winner/tie)
 Phase Two Comics, Pulp Fiction (winner/tie)
 Minotaur Books, Melbourne

FAVOURITE FOREIGN COMIC BOOK OR GRAPHIC NOVEL OF THE YEAR (favourite comic book or graphic novel (English or foreign language) released by overseas publishers during the year)
 "All-Star Superman" (DC Comics) (winner)
 "Fell" (Image Comics)
 "Hellboy: Strange Places" (Dark Horse Comics)

FAVOURITE FOREIGN CREATOR OF THE YEAR (favourite international creator (artist, writer etc.) with work released during the year)
 Frank Quitely (winner)
 Garth Ennis
 Warren Ellis

LEDGER OF HONOUR (nominees chosen from Australian creators, publishers or retailers past or present).
 Greg Gates (2007)

References

Notes

Sources consulted
 The Bulletin (7 December 2005)
 Inside Pulse - Jason Berek-Lewis (30 March 2005)

External links
 

Comics awards
Australian comics
Australian journalism awards
Australian literary awards
Australian art awards